The 2016 season for the  team began in January at the Tour Down Under and Tour de San Luis. The team participated in UCI Continental Circuits and UCI World Tour events when given a wildcard invitation.

2016 roster

Riders who joined the team for the 2016 season

Riders who left the team during or after the 2015 season

Season victories

References

External links

 

2016 road cycling season by team
2016 in Australian sport